Maksym Vyacheslavovych Marusych (born 17 July 1993) is a Ukrainian professional footballer who plays as a midfielder.

Career
Marusych is the product of the FC Vorskla Youth School System. But in July 2014 he signed 4,5 years deal with another Ukrainian Premier League club Karpaty. He made his debut for FC Karpaty entering as a second-half substitute against FC Hoverla Uzhhorod on 27 July 2014 in Ukrainian Premier League. But on 31 August 2014 the contract with Marusych was terminated.

Desna Chernihiv
In 2016 he signed for Desna Chernihiv.

On 1 March 2017, Maksym was announced as a member of Lithuanian A Lyga side Jonava.

In August 2019, Maksym joined FK Jelgava. He was released by the end of 2019.

FK Riteriai 
In 2 July 2021 signed with Riteriai.

Honours
RFS
 Latvian Cup: 2019, 2021

References

External links

1993 births
Living people
Sportspeople from Poltava
Ukrainian footballers
Association football midfielders
Ukraine under-21 international footballers
Ukraine youth international footballers
Ukrainian Premier League players
Ukrainian First League players
A Lyga players
Latvian Higher League players
Kazakhstan Premier League players
FC Vorskla Poltava players
FC Karpaty Lviv players
FC Hirnyk-Sport Horishni Plavni players
FC Desna Chernihiv players
FK Jonava players
FK RFS players
FK Jelgava players
FC Caspiy players
FK Riteriai players
Ukrainian expatriate footballers
Expatriate footballers in Lithuania
Expatriate footballers in Latvia
Expatriate footballers in Kazakhstan
Ukrainian expatriate sportspeople in Lithuania
Ukrainian expatriate sportspeople in Latvia
Ukrainian expatriate sportspeople in Kazakhstan